The International Classical Music Awards (ICMA) are music awards first awarded 6 April 2011. ICMA replace the Cannes Classical Awards (later called MIDEM Classical Awards) formerly awarded at MIDEM. The jury consists of music critics of magazines Andante, Crescendo, Gramofon, Kultura, Musica, Musik & Theater, Opera, Pizzicato, Rondo Classic, Scherzo, with radio stations MDR Kultur (Germany), Orpheus Radio 99.2FM (Russia), Radio 100,7 (Luxembourg), the International Music and Media Centre (IMZ) (Austria), website Resmusica.com (France) and radio Classic (Finland).

The award ceremony and gala concert 2012 took place in Nantes (15 May 2012, Orchestre National des Pays de la Loire). The award ceremony and gala concert 2013 were held in Milan (18 March 2013) and hosted by Orchestra Sinfonica di Milano Giuseppe Verdi. In 2014, the award ceremony and gala concert took place in Warsaw during the Beethoven Festival (with the Sinfonia Iuventus). The award ceremony and gala concert 2015 took place in Ankara with the Bilkent Symphony Orchestra (28 March 2015).

Award ceremony hosts
 2011 Tampere
 2012 Nantes
 2013 Milan
 2014 Warsaw
 2015 Ankara
 2016 San Sebastián
 2017 Leipzig
 2018 Katowice
 2019 Lucerne
 2020 Seville
 2021 Vaduz
 2023 Wrocław

2011
The Jury announced the winners for 2011 in 20 categories from a nomination list comprising over 500 CD and DVD productions.

2011 special awards
 Lifetime Achievement Award: Menahem Pressler, founder of the Beaux Arts Trio
 Artist of the Year: Esa-Pekka Salonen
 Young Artist of the Year: David Kadouch (French pianist)
 Label of the Year: Chandos Records
 Special Achievement Award: BIS Records' complete Sibelius Edition
 Website/Online Award: Berlin Philharmonic Orchestra Digital Concert Hall

2011 audio and video categories
 Recording of the Year + Opera category – Mozart Die Zauberflöte, Akademie für Alte Musik Berlin dir. René Jacobs (Harmonia Mundi HMC 90206870)
 Symphonic – Shostakovich 8th Symphony, Royal Liverpool Philharmonic Orchestra conducted by Vasily Petrenko (Naxos)
 Baroque – Via Crucis soloists Núria Rial, Philippe Jaroussky, L'Arpeggiata, cond. Christina Pluhar (Virgin Classics 5099969457708)
 Chamber Music – Beethoven Violin Sonatas Nos 3, 9 "Kreutzer" – Viktoria Mullova, Kristian Bezuidenhout (Onyx 4050)
 Choral – Stravinsky Oedipus Rex – Depardieu, Mariinsky Orchestra & Chorus, Gergiev (Mariinsky MAR0510)
 Concerto – Schumann Complete Works for Violin and Orchestra – Lena Neudauer, German Radio PO, Pablo González (Hänssler Classic CD 93 258)
 Contemporary – Friedrich Cerha Spiegel-Monumentum-Momente – SWR Symphony Orchestra Baden-Baden & Freiburg, Sylvain Cambreling (Kairos KAI0013002)
 Early Music – Dinastia Borgia Book and CDs – Montserrat Figueras, Hespèrion XXI, Jordi Savall (Alia Vox AVSA9875A+C)
 First Recording – Vivaldi Armida al campo d'Egitto Concerto Italiano, Rinaldo Alessandrini (Naïve OP30492)
 Historical – Sibelius Complete Symphonies – Moscow Radio Symphony Orchestra, Gennady Rozhdestvensky (Melodiya MELCD 1001669)
 Solo Instrumental – Debussy Complete Piano Works Vol 5 – Jean-Efflam Bavouzet (Chandos CHAN 10545)
 Vocal Recital – Mahler Lieder – Christian Gerhaher, Gerold Huber (RCA 886975677320)
 DVD Performance – Wagner Der Ring des Nibelungen – cond. Zubin Mehta, Orquestra de la Comunitat Valenciana with La Fura dels Baus (C Major 703 808)
 DVD Documentary – Tchaikovsky Two films: (Tchaikovsky's Women, Fate) – Christopher Nupen (Allegro Films A 10CN D)

2012
The Jury announced the winners for 2012 in 20 categories from a nomination list comprising over 250 CD and DVD productions.

2012 special awards
 Lifetime Achievement Award: Krzysztof Penderecki
 Artist of the Year: Jean-Efflam Bavouzet
 Young Artist of the Year: Joseph Moog (pianist)
 Label of the Year: Ondine
 Special Achievement Award: Ward Marston (restorer of historical recordings)
 Website/Online Award: classicalplanet.com

2012 audio and video categories
 Recording of the Year + Solo instrumental category: Robert Schumann: Papillons, Klaviersonate op. 11, Kinderszenen, Fantasie op. 17, Waldszenen, Thema mit Variationen (Geistervariationen); Andras Schiff (ECM 2122/23)
 Symphonic: Gustav Mahler: Symphony No. 4; Sunhae Im, Pittsburgh Symphony Orchestra, Manfred Honeck (Exton EXCL00048)
 Baroque instrumental: Rameau: L’Orchestre de Louis XV – Rameau: Les Indes galantes, Naïs, Zoroastre, Les Boréades (Orchestral Suites); Le Concert des Nations, Jordi Savall (Alia Vox AVSA9882)
 Baroque vocal: Heinrich Schütz: Musicalische Exequien; Vox Luminis, Lionel Meunier (Ricercar RIC 311)
 Chamber Music: Ludwig van Beethoven: Septet op. 20, Sextet op. 71; Scharoun Ensemble Berlin (Tudor 7146)
 Choral: Gabriel Fauré: Requiem; Philippe Jaroussky, Matthias Goerne, Chœur de l'Orchestre de Paris, Orchestre de Paris, Paavo Järvi (Virgin 5099908847027)
 Concerto: French Impressions – Camille Saint-Saëns, Eugène Ysaÿe, Ernest Chausson, Maurice Ravel; Rachel Kolly d'Alba, Orchestre Symphonique de Bienne, Jean-Jacques Kantorow, Orchestre National des Pays de la Loire, John Axelrod (Warner Classics 2564671814)
 Contemporary: Krzysztof Penderecki: Viola Concerto, Cello Concerto No. 2; Grigory Zhislin, Tatjana Vassiljeva, Warsaw Philharmonic Orchestra, Antoni Wit (Naxos 8.572 211)
 Early Music; Palestrina Vol. 1 – Giovanni Pierluigi da Palestrina: Missa Assumpta est Maria, Salve Regina, Ave Maria; The Sixteen, Harry Christophers (Coro COR16091)
 Opera: Frank Martin – Der Sturm (opera); Robert Holl, Christine Buffle, Ethan Herschenfeld, James Gilchrist, Netherlands Radio Philharmonic Orchestra and Netherlands Radio Choir, conducted Thierry Fischer (Hyperion CDA678213)
 Historical: Béla Bartók: Concertos, Cantata profana, Divertimento, etc.; Tibor Varga, Andor Foldes, Géza Anda, Louis Kentner, Dietrich Fischer-Dieskau, RIAS Berlin, conducted Ferenc Fricsay (Audite 21 407)
 Vocal Recital: Tragédiennes 3 – Etienne Nicolas Méhul, Rodolphe Kreutzer, Antonio Salieri, Christoph Willibald Gluck, François Joseph Gossec, Hector Berlioz, etc.; Véronique Gens, Les Talens Lyriques, Christophe Rousset. (Virgin 50999 070927 2 5)
 Vocal Recital: Slavic Opera Arias – Piotr Ilyich Tchaikovsky, Parashkev Hadjiev, Alexander Borodin, Antonín Dvořák, Bedřich Smetana, Nicolai Rimsky-Korsakov; Veselin Stoyanov, Krassimira Stoyanova, Münchner Rundfunkorchester, Pavel Baleff (Orfeo C 830 111 A)
 DVD Performance: Gustav Mahler: Symphony No. 9; Lucerne Festival Orchestra, Claudio Abbado (Accentus Music ACC 20214)
 DVD Documentary: Carlos Kleiber – Traces to Nowhere; Film by Eric Schulz. With Plácido Domingo, Brigitte Fassbaender, Otto Schenk, Veronika Kleiber (Arthaus Musik 101553)

2013

2013 special awards
 Lifetime achievement award: Aldo Ciccolini
 Artist of the year: Carolin Widmann
 Young artist of the year vocal: Valer Sabadus
 Young artist of the year instrumental: Alessandro Mazzamuto (pianist)
 label of the year: Audite
 Classical website award: Philharmonia Orchestra
 Special achievement award: Robert von Bahr (BIS Records)
 Special achievement award: Orchestra Sinfonica di Milano Giuseppe Verdi (Orchestra LaVerdi)

2013 audio and video categories
 Early music: Amarcord – zu S. Thomas, Zwei Gregorianische Messen aus dem Thomas-Graduale – Thomaskirche Leipzig, um 1300; Amarcord Ensemble (RKap 10112)
 Baroque instrumental: Johann Sebastian Bach: Sonatas & Partitas BWV 1001–3 (Vol. II); Isabelle Faust, violin (Harmonia Mundi HMC 902124)
 Baroque vocal: Polychoral Splendour Music from the four galleries of the Abbey Church of Muri by Giovanni Gabrieli and Heinrich Schütz Cappella Murensis; (Siri Karoline Thornhill, Stephanie Petitlaurent, Rolf Ehlers, Jürgen Ochs, Mirko Ludwig, Manuel Warwitz, Simon Schnorr, Kees Jan De Koning, Les Cornets Noirs, Johannes Strobl (Audite 92.652)
 Vocal recital: Christian Gerhaher – Ferne Geliebte, Beethoven – Haydn – Schönberg – Berg; Christian Gerhaher, baritone, Gerold Huber, piano (Sony Classical 88691935432)
 Choral works: Felix Mendelssohn Bartholdy – Geistliches Chorwerk; Kammerchor Stuttgart, Frieder Bernius (Carus 83020)
 Opera: Stanislaw Moniuszko: Verbum nobile; Aleksander Teliga, Aleksandra Buczek, Leszek Skrla, Michal Partyka, Janusz Lewandowski, Chor i Orkiestra Opery na Zamku / Warcislaw Kunc (Dux 783)
 Solo instrument: Serge Rachmaninov: Piano Sonata No. 1 in D minor, Op. 28, Piano Sonata No. 2 in B flat minor, Op. 36; Nikolai Lugansky, piano (Naïve AM208)
 Chamber music: Olivier Messiaen: Quatuor pour la fin du temps; Carolin Widmann, violin, Jörg Widmann, clarinet, Nicolas Altstaedt, cello, Alexander Lonquich, piano (Orfeo C 840121 B)
 Concertos: Dances to a Black Pipe, Copland – Brahms – Fröst – Piazzolla – Hillborg – Högberg; Martin Fröst, Australian Chamber Orchestra, Richard Tognetti (BIS SACD 1863)
 Symphonic music: Albert Roussel: Le festin de l’araignée (The Spider’s Banquet), Padmâvatî; Royal Scottish National Orchestra, Stéphane Denève (Naxos 8.572243)
 Contemporary music: Einojuhani Rautavaara: Cello Concerto No. 2 Towards the Horizon, Modificata, Percussion Concerto Incantations; Truls Mørk, cello, Colin Currie, percussion, Helsinki Philharmonic Orchestra, John Storgårds (Ondine ODE11782)
 Best collection: Anton Bruckner: Symphonies No. 1 – 9; Gewandhausorchester Leipzig, Herbert Blomstedt (Querstand VKJK 1230)
 Historical recording: Les Ballets Russes, Igor Stravinsky: The Firebird, Petrushka, The Rite of Spring; Moscow Philharmonic, Moscow State Conservatory Symphony Orchestra, Radio and Television Symphony Orchestra, Dmitri Kitayenko, Pierre Boulez, Vladimir Fedoseyev (Melodiya 1001990)
 DVD performance: Francesco Cilea: Adriana Lecouvreur; Angela Gheorghiu, Jonas Kaufmann, Olga Borodina, Alessandro Corbelli, David Soar, Iain Paton, Janis Kelly, Sarah Castle, Maurizio Muraro, Bonaventura Bottone, Chorus and Orchestra of the Royal Opera House, Covent Garden, Sir Mark Elder (conductor) and David McVicar (stage director) (Decca 0743459)
 DVD documentaries: John Cage – Journeys in Sound. A Film by Allan Miller & Paul Smaczny, and written by Anne-Kathrin Peitz (Accentus ACC 20246)

2014

2014 special awards
 Lifetime achievement award: Charles Dutoit
 Artist of the year: Andreas Staier
 Young artist of the year: Adrien Boisseau
 Label of the year: Glossa
 Classical website award: Metropolitan Opera Archives
 Special achievement award: Ludwig van Beethoven Association, Kraków (Poland)
 Special achievement award: SWR Symphony Orchestra Baden-Baden and Freiburg

2014 audio and video categories
 Early music: Erasmus van Rotterdam: In Praise of Folly; Louise Moaty, Marc Mauillon, René Zosso, La Capella Reial de Catalunya, Hesperion XXI, Jordi Savall
 Baroque instrumental: The Scarlatti Restored Manuscript, Domenico Scarlatti, Antonio Soler: Sonatas; Andrea Bacchetti, piano, RCA Red Seal
 Baroque vocal: Giovanni Battista Pergolesi: Stabat Mater, Laudate Pueri, Confitebor tibi Domine; Philippe Jaroussky, Julia Lezhneva, Coro della Radiotelevisione della Svizzera Italiana, I Barocchisti, Diego Fasolis (Erato)
 Vocal recital: Franz Schubert: Erlkönig; Matthias Goerne, baritone & Andreas Haefliger, piano (Harmonia Mundi)
 Choral works: Berlioz: Grande messe des morts, Op. 5; Barry Banks, London Symphony Chorus, London Philharmonic Choir, London Symphony Orchestra, Sir Colin Davis , LSO Live
 Opera: Benjamin Britten: The Rape of Lucretia; Ian Bostridge, Angelika Kirchschlager, Christopher Purves, Susan Gritton, Peter Coleman-Wright, Claire Booth, Aldeburgh Festival Ensemble, Oliver Knussen (Erato)
 Solo instrument: Maurice Ravel: Valses nobles et sentimentales – George Enescu: Sonata op. 24/1 – Claude Debussy: 4 Préludes, Elisabeth Leonskaja, piano (eaSonus) & Scarlatti Illuminated (Scarlatti – Scarlatti/Tausig – Scarlatti/Friedman); Joseph Moog, piano (Onyx)
 Chamber music: Béla Bartok: String Quartet No. 3 – Alban Berg: String Quartet op. 3 – Alfred Schnittke: String Quartet No. 3; Signum Quartet (Capriccio)
 Concertos Béla Bartók: Violin Concerto No. 2, Sz 112 – Peter Eötvös: Seven – György Ligeti: Violin Concerto; Patricia Kopatchinskaja, Frankfurt Radio Symphony Orchestra, Ensemble Modern, Peter Eötvös (Naïve)
 Symphonic music: Johannes Brahms: Symphonies Nos. 1–4, Tragische Ouvertüre, Haydn-Variationen, Liebeslieder-Walzer etc.; Gewandhausorchester Leipzig, Riccardo Chailly (Decca)
 Contemporary music: Krzysztof Penderecki: The Complete Symphonies; Polish Sinfonia Iuventus Orchestra, Krzysztof Penderecki (Dux 947)
 Best collection: Paul Hindemith: Violin Concerto – Violin Sonatas; Frank Peter Zimmermann, violin, Enrico Pace, piano, Paavo Järvi, Frankfurt Radio Symphony Orchestra (BIS)
 Historical recording: Sergiu Celibidache – The Berlin Recordings, 1945–1957; Hans Bottermund, Helmut Heller, Lilia d’Albore, Erna Berger, Margarete Klose, Gustav Scheck, Gerhard Puchelt, Tibor de Machula, Raoul Koczalski, Hans Peter Schmitz, Helmut Schlövogt, Karl Rucht, Berliner Philharmoniker, Rundfunk-Sinfonieorchester Berlin, Radio-Symphonie-Orchester Berlin, Sergiu Celibidache (Audite)
 DVD performance: Sergey Prokofiev: The Gambler; Sergei Aleksashkin, Tatiana Pavlovskaya, Vladimir Galuzin, Larissa Dyadkova, Nikolai Gassiev, Alexander Gergalov, Nadezhda Serdyuk, Andrei Popov, Oleg Sychev, Andrei Spekhov, Mariinsky Orchestra, Valery Gergiev; Laurent Gentot, film director (Mariinsky)
 DVD documentaries: Refuge in Music – Terezin; A Film by Dorothee Binding and Benedict Mirow, with Anne-Sofie von Otter, Daniel Hope, Christian Gerhaher, Bengt Forsberg, Bebe Risenfors, Alice Herz-Sommer, Coco Schumann (Deutsche Grammophon)

2015

2015 special awards
 Lifetime Achievement Award: Dmitri Kitayenko
 Artist of the Year: Christian Tetzlaff
 Young artist of the Year vocal: Jodie Devos
 Young artist of the Year instrumental: Yury Revich
 Label of the Year: Accentus
 Special Achievement Award: Panufnik Edition: Lukasz Dlugosz, Ewa Kupiec, Alexander Sitkovetsky, Sarah van der Kemp, Michael von Schönermark, Raphael Wallfisch, Polish Radio Symphony Orchestra, Konzerthausorchester Berlin, Lukasz Borowicz (cpo).
 Special Achievement Award: Zhu Xiao-Mei, piano. Johann Sebastian Bach: The Art of Fugue (Accentus CD: ACC30308); Goldberg Variations (Accentus DVD: ACC20313)
 Special Achievement Award: Bilkent Symphony Orchestra

2015 audio and video categories
 Early music: Bal-Kan. Honey and Blood, Cycles of Life; Meral Azizoğlu, Irini Derebei, Gürsoy Dinçer, Lior Elmaleh, Montserrat Figueras, Tcha Limberger, Marc Mauillon, Amira Medunjanin, Stoimenka Outchikova-Nedyalkova, Agi Szalóki, Zacharias Spyridakis, Hesperion XXI, Jordi Savall (Alia Vox AVSA 9902)
 Baroque instrumental: Pavanes and Fantasies from the Age of Dowland; Dowland – Purcell – Jenkins – Lawes – Morley – Locke; John Holloway, Monika Baer, Renate Steinmann, Susanna Hefti, Martin Zeller (ECM 4810430)
 Baroque vocal: Vivaldi: Pieta – Sacred Works for Alto; Philippe Jaroussky, Ensemble Arteserse (Erato 825646258109)
 Vocal recital: Stella di Napoli; Pacini – Bellini – Carafa – Rossini – Mercadante – Donizetti...; Joyce DiDonato, Orchestre de l’Opéra national de Lyon, Riccardo Minasi (Erato 2564636562)
 Choral works: Beethoven: Missa Solemnis; Lucy Crowe, Jennifer Johnston, James Gilchrist, Matthew Rose, Monteverdi Choir, Orchestre Révolutionnaire et Romantique, Sir John Eliot Gardiner (Soli Deo Gloria SDG 718)
 Opera: Leonard Bernstein: West Side Story; Alexandra Silber, Cheyenne Jackson, Jessica Vosk, Kevin Vortmann, Juliana Hansen, Kelly Markgraf, Julia Bullock, San Francisco Symphony Chorus & Orchestra, Michael Tilson Thomas (SFS Media 821936-0059-2)
 Solo instrument: Franz Schubert: Sonatas D. 894 & D. 959; Evgeni Koroliov, piano (Tacet 979)
 Chamber music: Ludwig van Beethoven: Streichtrio op. 3 – Serenade op. 8; Frank Peter Zimmermann, Antoine Tamestit, Christian Poltéra (BIS 2087)
 Concertos: Joseph Haydn: Sinfonia Concertante; Wolfgang A. Mozart: Oboe Concerto; Lucas M. Navarro, Gregory Ahss, Konstantin Pfiz, Guilhaume Santana, Orchestra Mozart, Claudio Abbado (Claves 1302)
 Symphonic music: Anton Bruckner: Symphony No. 9; Lucerne Festival Orchestra, Claudio Abbado (Deutsche Grammophon 4793441)
 Contemporary music: Unsuk Chin: Piano and Cello Concertos, Su for Sheng and Orchestra; Alban Gerhardt, Wu Wei, Sunwook Kim, Seoul Philharmonic, Myung-Whun Chung (Deutsche Grammophon 481 0971)
 Best collection: Wolfgang Amadeus Mozart: Complete Symphonies; Danish National Chamber Orchestra, Ádám Fischer (Dacapo 8201201)
 Historical recording: Vaughan Williams: Symphonies Nos. 1–9; USSR Ministry of Culture Symphony Orchestra, Gennady Rozhdestvensky (Melodiya MELCD 1002170)
 DVD performance: Nikolaï Rimsky-Korsakov: The Legend of the Invisible City of Kitezh; Vladimir Vaneev, Maxim Aksenov, Svetlana Ignatovich, John Daszak, Alexey Markov, Netherlands Opera Chorus, Netherlands Philharmonic Orchestra, Marc Albrecht, conductor, Dmitri Tcherniakov, stage director (Opus Arte OA1089D)
 DVD documentaries: Richard Strauss and his Heroines; A Film by Thomas von Steinaecker; Brigitte Fassbaender, Renée Fleming, Gwyneth Jones, Christa Ludwig, Christian Strauss, Rufus Wainwright, Franz Welser-Möst (Arthaus Musik 102181)

2016

2016 special awards
 Lifetime Achievement Award: Felicity Lott
 Artist of the Year: Christian Lindberg
 Young artist of the Year: Pablo Ferrández
 Discovery Award: Nikolai Song (flautist)
 Label of the Year: Harmonia Mundi
 Special Achievement Award: Palazzetto Bru Zane
 Special Achievement Award: Dinorah Varsi Edition (Genuin)

2016 audio and video categories
 Early music: Argentum et Aurum – Musical Treasures of the Early Habsburg Renaissance; Ensemble Leones, Marc Lewon (Naxos 8.573346)
 Baroque instrumental: La Follia, Arcangelo Corelli: 6 Sonatas; Michala Petri, Mahan Esfahani (Our Recordings 6220610)
 Baroque vocal: Agrippina, Porpora – Graun – Händel: Arias; Ann Hallenberg, Il Pomo d’Oro, Riccardo Minasi (Deutsche Harmonia Mundi 88875055982)
 Vocal recital: Joyce & Tony at Wigmore Hall, Haydn – Rossini – Santoliquido – De Curtis – Foster – Kern ...; Joyce DiDonato, Antonio Pappano (Erato 2564610789)
 Choral works: Antonin Dvorak: Requiem; Ilse Eerens, Bernarda Fink, Maximilian Schmitt, Nathan Berg, Collegium Vocale Gent, Royal Flemish Philharmonic, Philippe Herreweghe (PHI LPH 016)
 Opera: Piotr Tchaikovsky: Iolanta; Olesya Golovneva, Alexander Vinogradov, Andrei Bondarenko, Dmytro Popov, Vladislav Sulimsky, John Heuzenroeder, Marc-Olivier Oetterli, Dalia Schaechter, Justyna Samborska, Marta Wryk, Choir of the Cologne Opera – Gürzenich Orchestra Cologne, Dmitri Kitayenko (Oehms Classics OC963)
 Solo instrument: Franz Schubert: Sonatas, Impromptus & Moments Musicaux; Andras Schiff (ECM 4811572)
 Chamber music: Johannes Brahms: Violin Sonatas Nos. 2 & 3 – Robert Schumann: Romances, Brahms/Schumann/Dietrich: F.A.E. Sonata; Isabelle Faust, Alexander Melnikov (Harmonia Mundi HMC902219)
 Concertos: Nikolai Medtner: Piano Concerto No. 3 – Alexander Scriabin: Piano Concerto; Yevgeny Sudbin, Bergen Philharmonic Orchestra, Andrew Litton (BIS Records 2088)
 Symphonic music: Jean Sibelius: Symphonies Nos. 1–7; Berliner Philharmoniker, Sir Simon Rattle (Berliner Philharmoniker Recordings BPHR 150071)
 Contemporary music: Krzysztof Penderecki: Clarinet Concerto, Flute Concerto, Concerto grosso for 3 Cellos and Orchestra; Michel Lethiec, Lukasz Dlugosz, Arto Noras, Bartosz Koziak, Rafal Kwiatkowski, Polish Sinfonia Iuventus Orchestra, Krzysztof Penderecki (Dux 1186)
 Best collection: Guerre et Paix, Blow – Biber – Caldara – Händel ...; Hesperion XXI, Le Concert des Nations, Capella Reial, Jordi Savall (Alia Vox AVSA9908)
 Historical recording: Lucerne Festival Historic Performances Vol. VIII, Beethoven: Piano Concerto No. 2, Schumann: Piano Concerto; Annie Fischer, Leon Fleisher, Swiss Festival Orchestra, George Szell, Philharmonia Orchestra, Carlo Maria Giulini (Audite 95643)
 DVD performance: Gustav Mahler: Symphony No. 7; Gewandhausorchester Leipzig, Riccardo Chailly (Accentus Music ACC20309 42)
 DVD documentaries: Daniil Trifonov, The Magics of Music – The Castelfranco Veneto Recital; By Christopher Nupen (Allegro Films A 19 CND)

2017 
The Jury announced the winners for 2017 in 22 categories from a nomination list comprising 321 Audio and Video productions (119 Labels).

2017 special awards
 Lifetime Achievement Award: Matti Salminen
 Artist of the Year: Tabea Zimmermann
 Young artist of the Year instrumental: Sophie Pacini
 Young artist of the Year vocal: Elsa Dreisig
 Discovery Award: Robert Neumann (pianist)
 Label of the Year: BIS Records
 Special Achievement Award: Klaus Heymann
 Special Achievement Award: Gewandhausorchester Leipzig
 Special Achievement Award: Ensemble Esperanza

2017 audio and video categories
 Early music: Roland De Lassus: Canticum Canticorum; Chœur de chambre de Namur, Ensemble Clematis, Leonardo García Alarcón (Ricercar RIC 370)
 Baroque instrumental: L’ange et le diable, Tartini – Locatelli – Vitali – Leclair – Forqueray; Chouchane Siranossian, Jos van Immerseel (Alpha 255)
 Baroque vocal: Serpent & Fire, Purcell – Graupner – Sartorio – Locke – Händel – Hasse – Cavalli; Anna Prohaska, Il Giardino Armonico, Giovanni Antonini (Alpha 250)
 Baroque vocal: J.S. Bach: Johannes-Passion; Werner Güra, Benno Schachtner, Sunhae Im, Sebastian Kohlhepp, Johannes Weisser, RIAS Kammerchor, Staats- & Domchor Berlin, Akademie für Alte Musik Berlin, René Jacobs (Harmonia Mundi HMC802236/37)
 Vocal recital: Schubertiade, Schubert: Lieder, Instrumentalstücke & Rezitation; Julian Prégardien, Marc Hantaï, Xavier Diaz-Latorre, Philippe Pierlot (Myrios MYR018)
 Choral works: Geistliche Gesänge: Reger – J.S. Bach – Nystedt; MDR-Rundfunkchor, Florian Helgath (Querstand VKJK 1627)
 Opera: Claude Vivier: Kopernikus; Svea Schildknecht, Uta Buchheister, Barbara Ostertag, Neal Banerjee, Ji-Su Park, Dorothea Winkel, Florian Kontschak, Holst-Sinfonietta, Opera Factory Freiburg, Klaus Simon (bastille musique bm001)
 Solo instrument: Piotr Tchaikovsky: The Seasons Op. 37bis, Children’s Album Op. 39; Elena Bashkirova (Gideon Boss GB008)
 Solo instrument: Sergei Lyapunov – Works for Piano Vol. 2; Florian Noack (Ars Produktion 38209)
 Chamber music: Duo Sessions, Halvorsen – Kodaly – Ravel – Schulhoff; Julia Fischer & Daniel Müller-Schott (Orfeo C902161A)
 Concertos: Mendelssohn: Violin Concerto op. 64, Schumann: Violin Concerto WoO 234; Carolin Widmann, Chamber Orchestra of Europe (ECM 4812635)
 Symphonic music: Claudio Abbado: The Last Concert, Mendelssohn: Ein Sommernachtstraum, Berlioz: Symphonie fantastique op. 14; Deborah York, Stella Doufexis, Damen des Chors des BR, Berliner Philharmoniker, Claudio Abbado (Berliner Philharmoniker Recordings BPHR 160081)
 Contemporary music: Oriental Trumpet Concertos, Penderecki – Say – Khachaturian – Arutiunian, Gábor Boldoczki, Sinfonietta Cracovia, Jurek Dybal (Sony Classical 88985361092)
 Best collection: Szymanowski: Overture op. 12, Lutoslawski: Cello Concerto, Symphony No. 4; Gautier Capuçon, Polish National Radio Symphony Orchestra, Alexander Liebreich (Accentus ACC30388)
 Historical recording: Mahler – Loewe – Wagner – Brahms – Schubert ...; Maureen Forrester, Hertha Klust, Michael Raucheisen, Felix Schröder (Audite 21437)
 Video performance: Alban Berg: Wozzeck; Christian Gerhaher, Gun-Brit Barkmin, Brandon Jovanovich, Mauro Peter, Wolfgang Ablinger-Sperrhacke, Lars Woldt, Pavel Daniluk, Cheyne Davidson, Martin Zysset, Irène Friedli, Philharmonia Zürich, Chor der Oper Zürich, Fabio Luisi, Stage Director: Andreas Homoki (Accentus Music)
 Video documentaries: Leonard Bernstein – Larger than Life; A Film by Georg Wübbolt (C Major 735908)

2018 
The jury has nominated 357 audio and video productions.

2018 special awards
 Lifetime Achievement Award: José van Dam
 Artist of the Year: Manfred Honeck
 Young artist of the Year: Christoph Sietzen (percussionist)
 Outstanding young Polish Artist: Szymon Nehring (pianist)
 Discovery Award: Yuan Yu (flautist)
 Label of the Year: Alpha
 Special Achievement Award: Krzysztof Penderecki Center Lusławice
 Special Achievement Award: Polish National Radio Symphony Orchestra in Katowice
 Special Achievement Award: Melodiya: Anthology of Russian Symphonic Music

2018 audio and video categories
 Early Music: Quattrocento – Musica y danza de la Corona de Aragon en Napoles, Capella de Ministrers, Carles Magraner. Capella de Ministrers CDM 1742.
 Baroque Instrumental: Vivaldi: The Concertos for Recorder, Stefan Temmingh, Capricornus Consort Basel. Accent ACC24332.
 Baroque Vocal: The Händel Album, Philippe Jaroussky, Ensemble Artaserse. Erato 190295774455.
 Vocal Recital: Visions, Bizet – Bruneau – David – Février – Franck – Godard – Halévy – Massenet – Niedermeyer – Saint-Saëns, Véronique Gens, Münchner Rundfunkorchester, Hervé Niquet. Alpha 279.
 Choral: Felix Nowowiejski: Quo vadis, Wioletta Chodowicz, Wojtek Gierlach, Robert Gierlach, Slawomir Kaminski, Podlasie Opera and Philharmonic Choir, Poznan Philharmonic Orchestra, Lukasz Borowicz. cpo 5550892.
 Opera: Camille Saint-Saëns: Proserpine, Véronique Gens, Marie-Adeline Henry, Frédéric Antoun, Andrew Foster-Williams, Jean Teitgen, Münchner Rundfunkorchester, Flemish Radio Choir, Ulf Schirmer. Ediciones Singulares ES1027.
 Solo Instrument: Franz Schubert: Piano Sonatas D 959 & D 960, Krystian Zimerman. Deutsche Grammophon 4797588.
 Chamber Music: Ludwig van Beethoven: Complete String Quartets Vol. VII & VIII, Beethoven: Quartets op. 18/2 & op. 59/3 – op. 18/3 & op. 74, Quartetto di Cremona. Audite 92.689 + 92.688.
 Concertos: Elgar: Cello Concerto – Martinu: Cello Concerto No. 1, Sol Gabetta, Berliner Philharmoniker, Simon Rattle, Krzysztof Urbanski. Sony Classical 88985350792.
 Symphonic: Bohuslav Martinu: The Symphonies, ORF Vienna Radio Symphony Orchestra, Cornelius Meister. Capriccio C5320.
 Contemporary: Tigran Mansurian: Requiem, Anja Petersen, Andrew Redmond, RIAS Kammerchor Berlin, Münchener Kammerorchester, Alexander Liebreich. ECM 4814101.
 Assorted Programs: Jean Sibelius: Tapiola – En Saga – 8 Songs (orchestrated by Aulis Sallinen), Anne-Sofie von Otter, Finnish Radio Symphony Orchestra, Hannu Lintu. Ondine ODE12895.
 Best Collection: Beethoven: The Complete Symphonies, Simona Saturova, Mihoko Fujimura, Christian Elsner, Christian Gerhaher, MDR Rundfunkchor, GewandhausChor & GewandhausKinderchor, Gewandhausorchester Leipzig, Herbert Blomstedt. Accentus Music ACC80322.
 Historical: Svjatoslav Richter plays Schubert, Live in Moscow, 1949–1963, Svjatoslav Richter. Profil PH17005.
 DVD Performance: Rereading Brahms, Brahms: The Symphonies, Orchestra della Svizzera Italiana, Markus Poschner. Sony Classical 88985388869.

2019 
ICMA Jury nominates 319 releases from 107 labels for the 2019 awards.

2019 special awards
 Lifetime Achievement Award: Nelson Freire
 Artist of the Year: Javier Perianes
 Young artist of the Year: Matko Smolcic (bassoonist)
 Discovery Award: Eva Gevorgyan (pianist)
 Label of the Year: Ars Produktion
 Composer Award: Francisco Coll
 Orchestra Award: Stephen Waarts (violinist)
 Special Achievement Award: Numa Bischof Ullmann

2019 audio and video categories
 Early Music: Music In Medieval Denmark: 13th – 15th Century, Ensemble Peregrina, Agnieszka Budzinska-Bennett, Benjamin Bagby. Tacet 243.
 Baroque Instrumental: Johann Sebastian Bach: Violin Concertos BWV 1041, 1042, 1052, Berliner Barock Solisten, Frank Peter Zimmermann, Hänssler Classic 17046.
 Baroque Vocal: 17th Century Sacred Music in Wroclaw, Concerto Palatino, Gli Angeli Genève, Wroclaw Baroque Orchestra, Stephan MacLeod. Claves 501805.
 Vocal Recital: Miroir(s), Gounod – Massenet – Puccini – Steibelt – Rossini – Mozart – R. Strauss, Elsa Dreisig, soprano, Orchestre National de Montpellier, Michael Schønwandt. Erato 190295634131.
 Choral: Sergei Prokofiev: Cantata for the 20th Anniversary of the October Revolution, Ernst Senff Choir (Steffen Schubert, choir director) – Erfurt Air Force Music Corps, Staatskapelle Weimar, Kirill Karabits. Audite 97754.
 Opera: Gioacchino Rossini: Semiramide, Albina Shagimuratova, Daniela Barcellona, Mirco Palazzi, Barry Banks, Gianluca Buratto, Susana Gaspar, David Butt Philip, James Platt, Opera Rara Chorus – Orchestra of the Age of Enlightenment, Mark Elder. Opera Rara 9293800572.
 Solo Instrument: Wolfgang A. Mozart: Fantasy K. 475 + Piano Sonatas Nos. 14, 16 & 18, Maxim Emelyanychev. Aparté AP 161.
 Chamber Music: Es war einmal – Once upon a time, Robert Schumann: Märchenerzählungen op. 132, Fantasiestücke op. 73 + Märchenbilder op. 113, Jörg Widmann: 5 Stücke im Märchenton, Jörg Widmann, Tabea Zimmermann, Dénes Várjon. Myrios MYR020.
 Concertos: The Golden Age – Cello 1925, Hindemith: Kammermusik No. 3 – Ibert: Concerto for Cello & Wind Instruments, Toch: Cello Concerto – Martinu: Concertino for Cello, Winds, Percussion & Piano, Christoph Heesch, Eroica Berlin, Jakob Lehmann. Genuin GEN18613.
 Concertos: Bartok: Violin Concertos Nos. 1 & 2, Christian Tetzlaff, Finnish Radio Symphony Orchestra, Hannu Lintu. Ondine ODE1317-2.
 Symphonic: Sibelius: Symphony No. 2 – Grieg: Allegretto grazioso + Melody Op. 34/2, Gürzenich-Orchester Köln, Dmitri Kitayenko. Oehms Classics OC457.
 Symphonic: Bernstein: Complete Symphonies + Prelude, Fugue & Riffs, Marie-Nicole Lemieux, Beatrice Rana, Nadine Sierra, Josephine Barstow, Orchestra dell'Accademia Nazionale di Santa Cecilia and Choir, Antonio Pappano. Warner Classics 01902956 61588.
 Contemporary: Arvo Pärt: Symphonies Nos. 1- 4, NFM Wroclaw Philharmonic, Tõnu Kaljuste. ECM New Series 2600.
 Assorted Programs: In Time, Felix Mendelssohn: Violin Concerto op. 64 + String Octet op. 20, Chouchane Siranossian, Anima Eterna Brugge, Jakob Lehmann, Balasz Bozzai, Nicolas Mazzoleni, Bernadette Verhagen, Katya Polin, Davit Melkonyan, Astrig Siranossian. Alpha 410.
 Best Collection: Jean Sibelius: Incidental Music, Turku Philharmonic Orchestra, Leif Segerstam. Naxos 8.506032.
 Video Performance: Bartok: Bluebeard’s Castle – Poulenc: La Voix Humaine, Barbara Hannigan, John Relyea, Ekaterina Gubanova, Paris Opera Orchestra, Esa-Pekka Salonen, Krzysztof Warlikowski. Arthaus Musik 109364.
 Video Performance: Mozart: Le Nozze di Figaro, Ildebrando D’Arcangelo, Dorothea Röschmann, Anna Prohaska, Lauri Vasar, Marianne Crebassa, Staatsoper Unter den Linden, Berlin, Gustavo Dudamel, Jürgen Flimm & Bettina Hartmann. Accentus Music ACC20366.
 Video Documentaries: Belcanto – The Tenors of the 78 Era, Documentary by Jan Schmidt-Garre, Caruso, Slezak, Tauber, McCormack, Schipa, Gigli, Schmidt, Koslovsky, Björling et al.. Naxos 2110389-91.

2020 
ICMA Jury nominates 390 audio and video productions from 130 labels for the 2020 awards.

2020 special awards
 Lifetime Achievement Award: Elisabeth Leonskaja
 Artist of the Year: Marina Rebeka
 Young artist of the Year: Erica Piccotti (cellist)
 Discovery Award: Philipp Schupelius (cellist)
 Label of the Year: Pentatone Classics
 Orchestra Award: Pepe Romero (guitarist)
 Composer Award: Ivan Boumans
 Special Achievement Award: John Axelrod, Jérôme Lejeune

2020 audio and video categories
 Early Music: Willaert e la Scuola Fiamminga a San Marco, Cappella Marciana, La Pifarescha, Marco Gemmani, Concerto Classics 2117
 Baroque Instrumental: Night Music, Vivaldi – Gerardo – Eyck – Lully – Hotteterre – Biber, Dorothee Oberlinger, I Sonatori de la Gioiosa Marca, Deutsche Harmonia Mundi 190759 12522
 Baroque Vocal: Georg Friedrich Händel: Serse, Franco Fagioli, Vivica Genaux, Inga Kalna, Francesca Aspromonte, Andrea Mastroni, Delphine Galou, Biagio Pizzuti, Il Pomo d’Oro, Maxim Emelyanychev, Deutsche Grammophon 4835784
 Vocal Music: Franz Schubert: Winterreise, Ian Bostridge, Thomas Adès, Pentatone Classics PTC 518676
 Choral Music: Piotr Tchaikovsky: Liturgy of St. John Chrysostom – Nine Sacred Choruses, Latvian Radio Choir, Sigvards Klava, Ondine ODE 1336-2
 Choral Music: Arthur Honegger: Jeanne d’Arc au Bûcher, Judith Chemla, Jean-Claude Drouot, Christian Gonon, Adrien Gamba-Gontard, Claire de Sévigné, Christine Goerke, Judit Kutasi, Jean-Noël Briend, Steven Humes, Rotterdam Symphony Chorus, Netherlands Children’s Choir, Royal Concertgebouw Orchestra, Stéphane Denève, RCO Live
 Opera: Antonio Salieri: Tarare, Judith van Wanroij, Jérôme Boutillier, Tassis Christoyannis, Philippe-Nicolas Martin, Cyrille Dubois, Jean-Sébastien Bou, Marine Lafdal-Franc, Danaé Monnié, Enguerrand de Hys, Karine Deshayes, Les Chantres du Centre de Musique Baroque de Versailles, Les Talens Lyriques, Christophe Rousset, Aparté
 Solo Instrument: Beethoven/Liszt – Schubert – Haydn – Say – Bartok – Sasaki, Can Çakmur, piano, BIS, 2430
 Solo Instrument: Schubert: Sonata D 960 – Drei Klavierstücke D 946 – Moments Musicaux D 780, Dina Ugorskaja, Cavi 8553107
 Chamber Music: Lili Boulanger: Nocturne – César Franck: Violin Sonata – Louis Vierne: Violin Sonata Op. 23 Eugène Ysaÿe: Poème élégiaque Op. 12, Alina Ibragimova, Cédric Tiberghien, Hyperion CDA68024
 Concertos: Ferruccio Busoni: Piano Concerto, Kirill Gerstein, Men of the Tanglewood Festival Chorus, Boston Symphony Orchestra, Sakari Oramo, Myrios MYR024
 Symphonic Music: Ludwig van Beethoven: Complete Symphonies, Sara Swietlicki, Morten Grove Frandsen, Ilker Arcayürek, Lars Møller, Danish National Concert Choir, Danish Chamber Orchestra, Ádám Fischer, Naxos 8.505251
 Contemporary Music: Dusapin: Penthesilea, Georg Nigl, Natascha Petrinsky, Marisol Montalvo, Werner van Mechelen, Eve-Maud Hubeau, Wiard Withol, Yaroslava Kozin, Marta Baretta, Orchestre Symphonique et Chœurs de la Monnaie, Franck Ollu, Cyprès CYP4654
 Assorted Programs: Antonio Vivaldi: Arias & instrumental works, Léa Desandre, Bruno Philippe, Peter Whelan, Jean Rondeau, Cecilia Bernardini, Louis Creac’h, Jérôme Van Waerbeke, Douglas Balliett, Jupiter, Thomas Dunford, Alpha 550
 Best Collection: Mieczysław Weinberg: Chamber Music, Evgeniya Seydel, Alexander Brusilovsky, Fyodor Druzhinin, Alla Vasilieva, Mieczysław Weinberg, Timofei Dokschitzer, Moscow Chamber Orchestra, Moscow Philharmonic Orchestra, Borodin Quartet, Algis Zhuraitis, Rudolf Barshai, Melodiya MELCD 1002519
 Historical Recordings: Wilhelm Furtwängler – The Radio Recordings 1939–1945, Edwin Fischer, Peter Anders, Walter Gieseking, Tilla Briem, Elisabeth Höngen, Rudolf Watzke, Erna Berger, Walther Ludwig, Fritz Heitmann, Georg Kulenkampff, Conrad Hansen, Pierre Fournier, Adrian Aeschbacher, Berliner Philharmoniker, Wilhelm Furtwängler, Berliner Philharmoniker Recordings
 Video Performance: Richard Strauss: Salome, Asmik Grigorian, John Daszak, Anna Maria Chiuri, Gábor Bretz, Julian Prégardien, Wiener Philharmoniker, Franz Welser-Möst, Romeo Castellucci, stage director, Unitel Edition 801608
 Video Documentaries: Gidon Kremer – Finding your own voice, Directed Paul Smaczny, Kremerata Baltica, Giedre Dirvanauskaite, Tatjana Grindenko, Olesya Petrova, Evgeny Svetlanov Orchestra, Vladimir Jurowski, Yomiuri Nippon Symphony, Jacek Kaspszyk, Mieczyslaw Weinberg: Preludes to a Lost Time, Accentus ACC20414

2021
ICMA Jury has nominated 365 audio and video productions from 122 labels.

2021 special awards
 Lifetime Achievement Award: Edita Gruberová
 Artist of the Year: Pablo Heras-Casado
 Young artist of the Year: Can Cakmur (pianist)
 Discovery Award: Maya Wichert (violinist)
 Label of the Year: Berliner Philharmoniker Recordings
 Orchestra Award: Marc Bouchkov (violinist), Kian Soltani (cellist)
 Composer Award: Ivan Boumans
 Special Achievement Award: Drazen Domjanic, Ingolf Turban (violinist)

2021 audio and video categories
 Early Music: Bonefont – Bruck – Gombert – Kerle – Lassus, Huelgas Ensemble, Paul van Nevel, Cyprès CYP1682
 Baroque Instrumental: Giuseppe Tartini: Violin Concertos, Chouchane Siranossian, Venice Baroque Orchestra, Andrea Marcon, Alpha 596
 Baroque Instrumental: The Berlin Album, Benda – Graun – Janitsch – Kirnberger – von Preußen – Schulz, Ensemble Diderot, Johannes Pramsohler, Audax ADX13726
 Baroque Vocal: La Francesina, Handel’s Nightingale, Sophie Junker, Le Concert de l’Hostel Dieu, Franck-Emmanuel Comte, Aparté AP233
 Vocal Music: Anima Rara, Catalani – Giordano – Leoncavallo – Mascagni – Massenet – Puccini, Ermonela Jaho, Orquestra de la Comunitat Valenciana, Andrea Battistoni, Opera Rara ORR253
 Choral Music: Igor Kuljeric: Glagolitic Requiem, Jakov Gotovac: Himna Slobodi, Kristina Kolar, Eric Laporte, Annika Schlicht, Ljubomir Puskaric, Chor des Bayerischen Rundfunks, Münchner Rundfunkorchester, Ivan Repusic, BR Klassik 900331
 Opera: Camille Saint-Saëns: Le Timbre d’Argent Hélène Guilmette, Jodie Devos, Edgaras Montvidas, Yu Shao, Tassis Christoyannis, Jean-Yves Ravoux, Matthieu Chapuis, Accentus, Les Siècles, François-Xavier Roth, Bru Zane BZ1041
 Solo Instrument: Maurice Ravel: La Valse, Miroirs – Igor Stravinsky: The Firebird, Petrushka, Beatrice Rana, Warner Classics 9029541109
 Chamber Music: Fantasque, Fauré: Violin Sonata No. 1 – Debussy: Violin Sonata – Ravel: Violin Sonata No. 2 – Poulenc: Violin Sonata, Franziska Pietsch, Josu de Solaun, Audite 97751
 Concertos: Dmitri Shostakovich: Cello Concertos Nos. 1 & 2, Alban Gerhardt, WDR Sinfonieorchester Köln, Jukka-Pekka Saraste, Hyperion CDA68340
 Symphonic Music: Beethoven: Symphonies Nos. 7 & 9 – Tchaikovsky: Symphonies Nos. 5 & 6 – Franz Schmidt: Symphony No. 4 – Stephan: Music for Orchestra, Marlis Petersen, Elisabeth Kulman, Benjamin Bruns, Kwangchul Youn, Rundfunkchor Berlin, Berliner Philharmoniker, Kirill Petrenko, Berliner Philharmoniker Recordings
 Contemporary Music: Thomas Adès: Powder Her Face, Berceuse, Mazurkas, In Seven Days, Kirill Gerstein, Tanglewood Music Centre Orchestra, Thomas Adès, Myrios MYR027
 Assorted Programs: Beethoven: Piano Concerto No. 4, Coriolan Overture, The Creatures of Prometheus Overture, Kristian Bezuidenhout, Freiburger Barockorchester, Pablo Heras-Casado, Harmonia Mundi HMM 902413
 Best Collection: Dmitrij Kitajenko Collection, Bernstein – Butsko – Flyarkovsky – Gabeli – Kabalevsky – Khachaturian – Rachmaninov – Rimsky-Korsakov – R. Strauss – Theodorakis – Yanchenko, Various soloists, Stanislavsky and Nemirovich-Danchenko Moscow Academic Music Theatre Orchestra, Moscow Philharmonic Orchestra, Dmitrij Kitajenko, Melodiya
 Historical Recordings: Live in Moscow 1951–1963, Dmitri Shostakovich: 24 Preludes and Fugues op. 87, Svjatoslav Richter, Emil Gilels, Tatiana Nikolayeva, Dmitri Shostakovich, Profil PH 20054
 Video Performance: Rachmaninov: Piano concerto No. 3 + Etude-Tableau + Vocalise + Symphony No. 3, Denis Matsuev, Lucerne Festival Orchestra, Riccardo Chailly, Accentus Music ACC20487
 Video Performance: Thomas: Hamlet, Stéphane Degout, Sabine Devieilhe, Laurent Alvaro, Sylvie Brunet-Grupposo, Nicolas Legoux, Julien Behr, Jérôme Varnier, Yoann Dubruque, Kevin Amiel, Chœur Les Eléments, Orchestre des Champs-Elysées, Louis Langrée, conductor, Cyril Teste, stage director, Naxos 2.11064 & NBD0103V
 Video Documentaries: Lucas Debargue – To Music, A film by Martin Mirabel, Naxos 2.110639 & NBD0101V

Prior

The original chairman of the awards was the New York music critic David Hurwitz. Voting was conducted by a multinational jury of several hundred music critics from magazines including Hurwitz' ClassicsToday.com website, Crescendo (Belgium), Répertoire (France), Pizzicato (Luxemburg), Klassik Heute (Germany), Scherzo (Spain), Musica (Italy) etc.

In 2011, the awards were replaced with the International Classical Music Awards (ICMA), which were first awarded in Tampere, Finland on April 6.

References

External links
 

International music awards
Classical music awards
Recurring events established in 2011